Diamond Head is a volcanic tuff cone on the Hawaiian island of Oahu and known to Hawaiians as Lēahi. The Hawaiian name is most likely derived from lae (browridge, promontory) plus ahi (tuna) because the shape of the ridgeline resembles the shape of a tuna's dorsal fin. Its English name was given by British sailors in the 19th century, who named it for the calcite crystals on the adjacent beach.

Geology 

Diamond Head is part of the system of cones, vents, and their associated eruption flows that are collectively known to geologists as the Honolulu Volcanic Series, eruptions from the Koolau Volcano that took place long after the volcano formed and had gone dormant. These eruptive events created many of Oahu's well-known landmarks, including Punchbowl Crater, Hanauma Bay, Koko Head, and Mānana Island.

Like the rest of the Honolulu Volcanic Series, Diamond Head is much younger than the main mass of the Koolau Mountain Range. While the Koolau Range is about 2.6 million years old, Diamond Head is estimated to be about 400,000 to 500,000 years old.

History 
Known as Lēʻahi in Hawaiian, the mountain was given the name Diamond Hill in 1825 by British sailors who discovered sparkling volcanic calcite crystals in the sand and mistook them for diamonds. This is reflected in another local name, Kaimana Hila. The name later became Diamond Head, with head being shortened from headland.

The interior and adjacent exterior areas were the home to Fort Ruger, the first United States military reservation on Hawaii. Only Battery 407, a National Guard emergency operations center, and Birkhimer Tunnel, the Hawaii State Civil Defense Headquarters (HI-EMA), remain in use in the crater. An FAA air traffic control center was in operation from 1963 to 2002.

Tourism 

Diamond Head is a defining feature of the view known to residents and tourists of Waikīkī, and also a U.S. National Natural Monument. The volcanic tuff cone is a State Monument. While part of it is closed to the public and serves as a platform for antennas used by the U.S. government, the crater's proximity to Honolulu's resort hotels and beaches makes the rest of it a popular destination.

National Natural Landmark 
In 1968, Diamond Head was declared a National Natural Landmark. The crater, also called Diamond Head Lookout, was used as a strategic military lookout in the early 1900s. Spanning over 475 acres (190 ha) (including the crater's interior and outer slopes), it served as an effective defensive lookout because it provides panoramic views of Waikīkī and the south shore of Oahu.

The Diamond Head Lighthouse, a navigational lighthouse built in 1917 is directly adjacent to the crater's slopes. In addition, a few pillboxes are on Diamond Head's summit.

In popular culture 
Diamond Head appears on an 80-cent air mail stamp issued in 1952 to pay for shipping orchids to the U.S. mainland.

A 1975 televised game show, The Diamond Head Game, was set at Diamond Head.

The Crater was the location of several concerts in the 1960s and 1970s. First held on New Year's Day 1969, and often known as Hawaiian Woodstock, Diamond Head Crater Festivals, sometimes called Sunshine Festivals, were all-day music celebrations held in the 1960s and '70s, attracting over 75,000 attendees for performances of the Grateful Dead, Santana, America, Styx, Journey, War, and Tower of Power, alongside Hawaiian talent like Cecilio & Kapono and the Mackey Feary Band. The one-day festivals became two-day events in 1976 and 1977, but were canceled by the Hawai'i Department of Land and Natural Resources because of community noise and environmental impact concerns. Many items from the bands were brought into and out of the Crater by helicopter.

See also 
Diamond Head Lighthouse
Diamond Head Theatre
Kapiolani Community College

References

External links

Official website Hawaii State Parks - Diamond Head State Monument

Satellite image of Diamond Head (Google Maps)

Landforms of Oahu
Manoa
Tuff cones
Volcanoes of Oahu
National Natural Landmarks in Hawaii
Pleistocene volcanoes
Pleistocene Oceania
Cenozoic Hawaii
Extinct volcanoes
Hotspot volcanoes
Monogenetic volcanoes
Geography of Honolulu County, Hawaii
Tourist attractions in Honolulu
Honolulu